Steven William Dreyer (born November 19, 1969) is a former baseball player who was a pitcher in the Major Leagues from 1993 to 1994  for the Texas Rangers. He was acquired by the Rangers in the 8th round of the June 1990 amateur draft. His career highlight was coming out of the bullpen in relief of Nolan Ryan in his final major-league appearance on September 22, 1993. currently teaches physical education at Legacy Elementary School in Madison, AL. His son pitches for the University of Iowa.

References

1969 births
Living people
Major League Baseball pitchers
Texas Rangers players
Oklahoma City 89ers players
Northern Iowa Panthers baseball players
Baseball players from Iowa
Sportspeople from Ames, Iowa
Butte Copper Kings players
Gastonia Rangers players
Gulf Coast Rangers players
Charlotte Rangers players
Salt Lake Buzz players
Tulsa Drillers players